111th meridian may refer to:

111th meridian east, a line of longitude east of the Greenwich Meridian
111th meridian west, a line of longitude west of the Greenwich Meridian